A supporting character is a character in a narrative that is not the focus of the primary storyline, but is important to the plot/protagonist, and appears or is mentioned in the story enough to be more than just a minor character or a cameo appearance. Sometimes, supporting characters may develop a complex backstory of their own, but this is usually in relation to the main character, rather than entirely independently. In television, supporting characters may appear in more than half of episodes per season. Some examples of well-known supporting characters include Watson in the Sherlock Holmes stories, Donkey in the Shrek films, and Ron Weasley in the Harry Potter series.

In some cases, especially in ongoing material such as comic books and television series, supporting characters themselves may become main characters in a spin-off if they gain sufficient approval from their audience.

See also
Cameo
 Bit player
 Henchman
 Sidekick

References

Theatre
Counterparts to the protagonist